Mary-Catherine Deibel, along with Deborah Hughes, was the owner of Upstairs On the Square (previously known as Upstairs at the Pudding) and known as the unofficial mayor of Harvard Square. When the restaurant closed, she became the development director at the Cambridge Center for Adult Education.  At the restaurant, Diebel was in charge of public relations and hospitality.

As of 2022, she is President of the Harvard Square Business Association (HSBA) Board of Directors.

Early life
Deibel attended Newton College, then went on to graduate school to study English.  After school, she managed classical music groups. She was working at Boston Baroque when sne and Hughes decided to open a restaurant.

When she and Hughes opened UpStairs at the Pudding in 1982, Deibel “represented an exception to the male-dominated business community.”

References

Living people
Restaurant founders
Year of birth missing (living people)

American women restaurateurs
American restaurateurs
Harvard Square
Newton College of the Sacred Heart alumni